"Breathe (Don't Stop)" is a song released by Mr. On and the Jungle Brothers, from the Jungle Brothers' album You in My Hut Now. The song was not commercially successful, reaching number 33 on the Australian ARIA singles chart, and number 30 on the New Zealand RIANZ singles chart. "Breathe (Don't Stop)" also peaked at number 56 in the Netherlands.

It is based on samples from Michael Jackson's "Don't Stop 'til You Get Enough"

Official versions
"Breathe (Don't Stop)" (Album Version) – 3:32

Track listing

Charts

References

2004 singles
2004 songs